Cyprian Stanley Okoroigwe (born 1 October 1982) is a Nigerian former professional footballer who played as a forward.

References

Nigerian footballers
1982 births
Living people
Expatriate footballers in India
Nigerian expatriate sportspeople in India
I-League players
Mohun Bagan AC players
Mohammedan SC (Kolkata) players
Association football forwards
Aryan FC players